John Wise may refer to:
 John Wise (clergyman) (1652–1725), Massachusetts divine who protested taxation
 John Wise (Virginia politician) (fl. 1768–1812), Speaker of Virginia House of Delegates
 John Wise (balloonist) (1808–1879), American ballooning pioneer
 John Ayshford Wise (1810–1865), British MP for Stafford
 John Richard de Capel Wise (1831–1890), British writer
 John Sergeant Wise (1846–1913), U.S. Congressman (Readjuster Party) from Virginia
 John Wise (Australian politician) (1856–1942), New South Wales politician
 John Henry Wise (1868–1937), Hawaiian politician
 John Humphrey Wise (1890–1984), British colonial administrator
 John Wise (Canadian politician) (1935–2013), former Progressive Conservative MP and federal Minister of Agriculture
 John Wise (sport shooter) (1901–1971), Australian, competed at the 1948 Olympic Games
 John Wise (footballer) (born 1954), Australian footballer
 John A. Wise (1939–2011), American scientist

See also
Jon Wise (born 1977), British TV critic